Marcus Charles Lawrence Kline (March 26, 1855 – March 10, 1911) was a Democratic member of the U.S. House of Representatives from Pennsylvania.

Biography
Marcus C. L. Kline was born in Emmaus, Pennsylvania.  He graduated from Muhlenberg College in Allentown, Pennsylvania where he was a member of the Chi Phi Fraternity.  He studied law, was admitted to the bar in 1876 and commenced practice in Allentown.  He served as city solicitor of Allentown in 1877, as district attorney for Lehigh County, Pennsylvania, from 1887 to 1890, and chairman of the Democratic county committee of Lehigh County from 1895 to 1899.  He worked as president of the Lehigh Valley Trust Co. from 1899 to 1906.

Kline was elected as a Democrat to the Fifty-eighth and Fifty-ninth Congresses.  He was not a candidate for renomination in 1906.

After his time in Congress, he resumed the practice of his profession and also engaged in banking. He worked as president of the Allentown Trust Co. 1907–1911. He was a delegate to the 1908 Democratic National Convention.  He died in Allentown on March 10, 1911, and was interred in Fairview Cemetery in Allentown.

Sources

External links
Marcus C.L. Kline at The Political Graveyard

1855 births
1911 deaths
People from Lehigh County, Pennsylvania
Muhlenberg College alumni
Democratic Party members of the United States House of Representatives from Pennsylvania
19th-century American politicians